Dr. Freda Miller, FRSC is a developmental neurobiologist at the Hospital for Sick Children Research Institute and a professor at the University of Toronto. Dr. Miller holds a Canada Research Chair in developmental neurobiology and her work focuses on development and regeneration of neurons.

Education and early life 
Dr. Miller spent some of her early years in Calgary and attended the gifted program at Queen Elizabeth High School in Calgary. She received a Ph.D. degree in medical sciences at the University of Calgary and earned her B.Sc. degree in biochemistry at the University of Saskatchewan. 

In 2002, Miller was a founder of the Canadian biotech company Aegera Therapeutics.

Achievements 

 Fellow, Royal Society of Canada
 International Research Scholar, Howard Hughes Medical Institute
 Fellow, American Association for the Advancement of Science
President of the Canadian Association for Neuroscience 2016-2017

Honors and distinctions 
In recognition of Dr. Freda Miller's scientific career, trustees of the Calgary Board of Education named a new elementary school "Dr. Freda Miller School". The school opened in September 2020.

Research 

Dr. Freda Miller works on neuronal repair mechanism and has published over 140 articles on different areas of the nervous system, including skin stem cells, neuronal growth, survival and death. Miller also has 15 issued and pending patents.  

Her research interests include: 

 Neural stem cells
 Neurotrophin growth, connectivity and cell survival 
 Molecular regulation of neurogenesis

References 

Year of birth missing (living people)
Living people
Academic staff of the University of Toronto
University of Calgary alumni
University of Saskatchewan alumni
Fellows of the Royal Society of Canada
Canadian neuroscientists